Melanie Stabel (born 30 September 1999) is a German deaf sport shooter. She represented Germany at the 2017 Summer Deaflympics and claimed 3 medals including a gold medal in the women's 10m air rifle with a record score of 412.6 in the finals.

Melanie broke the deaf world record for shooting in the 10m air rifle for women in the 2017 Summer Deaflympics at the age of just 17 by competing in an international multi-sport event for the first time. She also claimed 2 silver medals in the women's 50m air rifle and 50m air rifle prone events. Melanie too broke the deaf world record for women in the 50m rifle prone category with a record score of 615.3 during the qualifiers as a part of the 2017 Summer Deaflympics.

References

External links 
 Profile at ICSD
 Profile at Deaflympics

1999 births
Living people
German female sport shooters
Deaf sportspeople
Place of birth missing (living people)
German deaf people
21st-century German women